Thermitase (thermophilic Streptomyces serine proteinase, Thermoactinomyces vulgaris serine proteinase) is an enzyme. This enzyme catalyses the following chemical reaction

 Hydrolysis of proteins, including collagen

This peptidase is isolated from Thermoactinomyces vulgaris.

References

External links 
 

EC 3.4.21